Keith Bentley (born 1 October 1959) is a former professional rugby league footballer who played in the 1970s, 1980s and 1990s.

Playing career

Widnes
Keith Bentley played in Widnes' 18–9 victory over Hull Kingston Rovers in the 1981 Challenge Cup Final during the 1980–81 season at Wembley Stadium, London on Saturday 2 May 1981.

Bentley played , and scored a try in Widnes' 3–8 defeat by Leigh in the 1981 Lancashire Cup Final during the 1981–82 season at Central Park, Wigan on Saturday 26 September 1981.

In April 1982, Bentley was transferred to Barrow in exchange for Chris Camilleri.

Salford
Bentley was signed by Salford in September 1983. He had a spell on loan at Leigh during the 1986–87 season.

Bentley played right-, and scored a try in Salford's 17–22 defeat by Wigan in the 1988 Lancashire Cup Final during the 1988–89 season at Knowsley Road, St. Helens on Sunday 23 October 1988.

Representative honours
Bentley won a cap for Great Britain while at Widnes in 1980 against New Zealand.

Bentley also represented Lancashire, playing four times for the team between 1980 and 1981.

References

External links
Statistics at rugby.widnes.tv

1959 births
Living people
Barrow Raiders players
English rugby league players
Great Britain national rugby league team players
Lancashire rugby league team players
Leigh Leopards players
Place of birth missing (living people)
Rugby league wingers
Salford Red Devils players
Widnes Vikings players